Roses In May (foaled February 9, 2000) is an American Thoroughbred racehorse who won 8 of his 13 races, including the 2005 Dubai World Cup, and earned $5,490,187.

Background
Roses In May, a black horse with a white star and snip, was bred by Margaux Farm in Midway, Kentucky. He was sired by Devil His Due, a multiple Gr.I winning stallion whose progeny earnings have totaled more than $53 million. Roses In May closely resembled his sire. His dam, Tell a Secret, was multiple Gr.3-placed, and produced several other stakes horses. Broodmare sire Speak John was a graded stakes winner who was Leading Broodmare Sire of 1985.

He was bought by Danzel Brendemuehl of Classic Bloodstock at the Keeneland Yearling Sale in September 2001 as a pinhook. Subsequently, he was sold by Classic Bloodstock at the OBS April 2002 two-year-old in training sale and purchased by Dr. Dave Lambert on behalf of Ken and Sarah Ramsey, who owned him during his racing career.

He was trained by Dale Romans and ridden in his most important races by jockey John Velazquez.

Racing career
Roses In May did not race as a juvenile. He broke his maiden in his second start as a sophomore at Churchill Downs, and won another race before contesting the Jerome Stakes in September. He finished sixth.

When he was four, he won the Grade I Whitney Handicap, the Grade II Kentucky Cup Classic Handicap, and the Grade III Cornhusker Breeders' Cup Handicap.  He came second in that year's (2004) Grade I Breeders' Cup Classic to Horse of the Year, Ghostzapper.

At five years of age, after placing in the Grade I Donn Handicap, won by Saint Liam, Roses In May was sent to Dubai for the world's richest horse race, the US$6,000,000 Dubai World Cup at Nad Al Sheba Racecourse in Dubai. Roses In May was favoured to win in the 2,000 metre race despite a poor draw. Roses In May broke slowly, but made up the lost ground and moved round the outside of the field to take the lead in the straight. He needed "little encouragement" to draw clear and win by three lengths from Dynever and Choctaw Nation.

The horse was the forty-third international winner at the 2005 Dubai International Racing Carnival. The carnival began on January 20, 2005, and concluded with the race for the Cup. In all, 200 horses and their trainers from twenty countries came to Dubai to compete for a total of US$25,000,000 in prize-money.

His win in Dubai proved to be his last race: in August 2005, veterinarian Dr. Steve Allday determined that Roses In May had sustained a tendon injury, which ended is racing career.

Stud record
Roses In May was retired on August 19, 2005, when a tendon tear was discovered in his left foreleg. It was announced the following May that he would stand in Japan at Big Red Farm.

He is currently at Big Red Farm in Niikappu, Hokkaido, Japan with a stud fee of $6,500.

His top progeny include:

 Dream Valentino: Hakodate Sprint Stakes (JPN-G3), Silk Road Stakes (JPN-G3), Hyogo Gold Trophy (JPN-G3), and JBC Sprint (JPN-L). Placed in the Sprinters Stakes (JPN-G1), Takamatsunomiya Kinen (JPN-G1), and Centaur Stakes (JPN-G2).
 Summit Stone: Urawa Kinen (JPN-L), Chunichi Hai Stakes, Kanazawa Sprint Cup, and Inuwashi Sho. Placed in the Tokyo Daishōten (JPN-G1) and multiple listed stakes. 2014 NAR Grand Prix Award for Horse of the Year and Best Thoroughbred Older Colt or Horse.
 Cosmo Ozora: Hochi Hai Yayoi Sho (JPN-G2). Fourth in the Satsuki Shō (JPN-G1). 
 Rose Princedom:  Leopard Stakes (JPN-G3). 
 Cosmo Thorn Park: Kokura Daishoten (JPN-G3) and New Year Stakes (JPN-L). Multiple stakes placed.
 Meiner Baika: Brazil Cup (JPN-L), Hakusan Daishoten (JPN-L), Betelgeuse Stakes (JPN-L). Placed in Tokai TV Hai Tokai Stakes (JPN-G2) and Heian Stakes (JPN-G3). 
 Rose Julep: Crown Cup (JPN-L) and Hyogo Junior Grand Prix (JPN-L).

The Ferdinand Fee
When Roses In May went to Japan, there was a clause in his contract called a "buy-back clause."  Ever since the death of the racehorse, Ferdinand, who was sent to a slaughterhouse in Japan when his breeding days were done, the New York Owners and Breeder's Association, based in Saratoga Springs, New York, has begun asking for a small voluntary per-race charge (collected from owners of New York bred horses) called the "Ferdinand Fee".  These monies collected are intended for the Bluegrass Charities and the Thoroughbred Charities of America to help them fund race horse rescue and retirement groups.  Many owners are now including buy-back clauses within their stallion contracts.

References

2000 racehorse births
Racehorses bred in Kentucky
Racehorses trained in the United States
Dubai World Cup winners
Thoroughbred family 1-a